USS Mary Alice (SP-397) was a United States Navy patrol vessel commissioned in 1917 and sunk in 1918.

Mary Alice was built as the fast, private steam yacht Bernice in 1897 in Brooklyn, New York. She was renamed Oneta in 1907 and Mary Alice in 1910.

On 10 August 1917, the U.S. Navy purchased Mary Alice from William J. Conners of Buffalo, New York, for use as a section patrol vessel during World War I. She was commissioned as USS Mary Alice (SP-397) the same day.

As a unit of the Naval Coast Defense Reserve, Mary Alice was assigned to the 3rd Naval District. She patrolled Long Island Sound and the approaches to New York Harbor.

In early October 1918, Mary Alice, with Captain William A. Gill, President of the U.S. Navys Board of Inspection and Survey, embarked, served as an escort for the new submarine USS O-13 (Submarine No. 74) in Long Island Sound during O-13s pre-commissioning acceptance trials.  On 5 October 1918 while conducting a submerged circular run off Bridgeport, Connecticut, O-13 suddenly rammed Mary Alice amidships and holed her. Mary Alice sank within a few minutes 1,800 yards (1,646 meters) south of Penfield Reef Light with no loss of life, and O‑13 quickly rescued her entire crew from the water.

References

Department of the Navy Naval History and Heritage Command Online Library of Selected Images: Civilian Ships: Mary Alice (Steam Yacht, 1897). Served as USS Mary Alice (SP-397) in 1917–1918
NavSource Online: Section Patrol Craft Photo Archive: Mary Alice (SP 397)

Patrol vessels of the United States Navy
World War I patrol vessels of the United States
Ships built in Brooklyn
1897 ships
Individual yachts
Ships sunk in collisions
Ships sunk with no fatalities
Shipwrecks of the Connecticut coast
Maritime incidents in 1918